Hampden is an unincorporated community in Marengo County, Alabama, United States.  Hampden had a post office at one time, but it no longer exists.

Demographics

Hampden appeared on the 1870 U.S. Census as having 40 residents. Of those 40, 36 (90%) were black and 4 (10%) were white. This was the only time it was listed on the census.

Geography

References

Unincorporated communities in Alabama
Unincorporated communities in Marengo County, Alabama